Der Fahnder is a German television crime drama series which was aired between 1984 and 2005.

In the Netherlands, the series was broadcast by the VARA from 3 October 1985.

Plot 
The first title character of the series was the investigator Faber. His first name remained largely unmentioned, only very rarely did his girlfriend Susanne address him by his first name Hannes, mostly she also called him Faber. Faber did not wear a uniform and also more often exceeded the official regulations. Faber's official car was a lime-green Ford Granada of the first series, his regular pub was the local Treff of his partner. During Faber's entire time in the series, his most important colleague and comrade-in-arms was the younger and far more observant Max Kühn. With the departure of Faber, who according to the plot emigrated to Ireland with his partner, Kühn also disappeared from the series without further explanation. Both of their superiors were Chief Inspector Norbert Rick, who was the only character to remain in the entire series. 

After the departure of Faber and Kühn, the character Schatzschneider (initially just Otto), a civil servant who was still in uniform, who had already been gradually upgraded, moved up to number two. The new title character was Thomas Becker, who had been transferred to the precinct.

Cast
 Klaus Wennemann Hannes Faber (episodes 1–91)
 Jörg Schüttauf Thomas Becker (episodes 92–149)
 Michael Lesch Martin Riemann (episodes 151–175)
 Martin Lindow Thomas Wells (episodes 157–201)
 Dietrich Mattausch Norbert Rick (1984–2005)
 Hans-Jürgen Schatz Max Kühn (1984–1993)
 Dieter Pfaff Otto Schatzschneider (1984–1996)
 Barbara Freier Susanne (Faber's girlfriend) (1984–1993)
 Jophi Ries Gregor Solomon (1993–1995)
 George Lenz Frank Dennert (1993–1996)
 Andreas Mannkopff Franz Behrmann (1993–1996)
 Susann Uplegger Cornelia Seitz (1993–1996)
 Thomas Balou Martin Karlheinz Mischewski (1997–2000)
 Sascha Posch Konstantin Broecker (1997–2005)
 Astrid M. Fünderich Dr. Katharina Winkler (1997–2005)
 Andreas Windhuis Guido Kroppeck (2000–2005)

See also
List of German television series

External links
 

German crime television series
1980s German police procedural television series
1990s German police procedural television series
2000s German police procedural television series
1990s German television series
1984 German television series debuts
2005 German television series endings
German-language television shows
Das Erste original programming
Grimme-Preis for fiction winners